The Celtics–Pistons rivalry is a National Basketball Association (NBA) rivalry between the Boston Celtics and the Detroit Pistons. The two teams played each other in the NBA playoffs five times from 1985 to 1991, with Boston winning in 1985 and 1987, and Detroit winning en route to three consecutive NBA Finals appearances from 1988 to 1990. The rivalry peaked in the late 1980s, featuring players such as Larry Bird, Kevin McHale, Robert Parish, Dennis Rodman, Isiah Thomas, Joe Dumars, and Bill Laimbeer.

History

Pre-1980s
Between 1948 and 1978, the Celtics and Pistons were on opposite divisions/conferences in all but three seasons. The Pistons found success in the early 1950s behind George Yardley, making two NBA Finals appearances, while the Celtics soon built a dynasty behind Bill Russell, winning 11 championships between 1957 and 1969.

However, the Pistons were generally mediocre for a majority of the 1960s and 1970s, despite the presence of stars such as Dave DeBusschere, Dave Bing and Bob Lanier. Meanwhile, the Celtics continued to rack up championships with Russell, John Havlicek and Dave Cowens leading the way.

Bird and Isiah
In the 1978 NBA draft, the Celtics drafted Larry Bird who would soon resurrect the franchise's fortunes. Then in the 1981 NBA draft, the Pistons picked Isiah Thomas and along with head coach Chuck Daly he would also play a key role in his team's reemergence.

It was also in 1978 that the Pistons moved to the Eastern Conference, turning their matchups against the Celtics into an intra-conference affair. The Celtics would win three NBA championships in the 1980s, while the Pistons gradually built a team that eventually became the Bad Boys.

The two teams met in the  Eastern Conference Semifinals, where the Celtics ousted the younger Pistons in six games. But when they reengaged in the  Eastern Conference Finals, the Pistons were a vastly different team. The Bad Boys, as Detroit became known, used physical play to intimidate their way to victory. This roused the ire of Boston's players and fans, and the teams' mutual hatred of each other often led to on-court fighting. Detroit's biggest antagonists were Bill Laimbeer, Rick Mahorn and Dennis Rodman. In Game 3, Bird and Laimbeer were ejected for fighting as the Pistons won 122–104.

The most famous moment of the rivalry occurred during Game 5. Leading 107–106 with 5 seconds left, and Detroit threatening to take a 3–2 series lead, Isiah Thomas had his inbounds pass stolen by Bird, who dished it off to Dennis Johnson for the winning layup. With Parish forced to sit out Game 6 due to a suspension for punching Laimbeer in the second quarter of Game 5 (the first for a playoff game in NBA history; he also re-sprained his right ankle late in Game 5), the Pistons won Game 6 113–105 to send it back to Boston for Game 7. The Celtics ended the bitter series with a 117–114 win in Boston Garden over Detroit.

The Celtics and Pistons faced off anew in the  Eastern Conference Finals. This time the Pistons finally unseated the Celtics, winning the series 4–2 and advancing to the NBA Finals to face the Lakers. What was notable was the fact that Detroit, who entered the series with 21 straight losses at the Boston Garden, beat Boston by winning 2 of 3 there (Games 1 and 5). In Game 5, the Celtics led by 16 before the Pistons rallied to win 102–96 in OT. In addition, their rough play and intense defense made Bird's scoring drop to just 10 points per game on 35.1% shooting, forcing Boston to rely on McHale.

The teams met twice more in the Brid/Thomas era. In the  First Round, Detroit swept Boston 3–0 en route to their first championship, as the Celtics missed the services of Bird due to injury. Then in the  Eastern Conference Semifinals, the Pistons eliminated the Celtics in six games, but it proved to be the last hurrah for the two aging squads.

Later years
Both teams a period of rebuilding during the 1990s. Although the Pistons found a new star in Grant Hill, he was unable to lead the team back to championship contention. Meanwhile, the Celtics endured a long dry spell, not reaching the playoffs for much of the decade.

The 2000s saw both teams reemerge as contenders. In , the Celtics and Pistons met again in the Eastern Conference Semifinals.  Boston was led by Paul Pierce and Antoine Walker, while Detroit was led by Jerry Stackhouse and Ben Wallace. Though Detroit had a better regular season record, the Celtics surprisingly eliminated them in five games, reaching their first Conference Finals since 1988. However, the Pistons would go on to dominate the Eastern Conference, reaching six consecutive Conference Finals, two NBA Finals and winning the 2004 championship. One of the Pistons' key players during that era was Chauncey Billups, who the Celtics drafted third overall in the 1997 NBA draft but would later emerge as a star in Detroit. Meanwhile, the Celtics slid back to mediocrity, but was given a new lease in life during the 2007 offseason.

After acquiring Kevin Garnett and Ray Allen, the Celtics and Pistons renewed the rivalry as they met in the  Eastern Conference Finals. However, the grind of reaching six straight conference finals took its toll on Detroit as Boston toppled their rivals in six games, eventually winning the championship that year.

The 2010s saw both teams head into opposite directions. Detroit endured a lengthy rebuild with only two playoff appearances, while Boston maintained its status as a playoff contender behind new stars such as Jayson Tatum, Jaylen Brown, Gordon Hayward, Kyrie Irving and Kemba Walker.

Head to head

Statistics

Common Players
 Jerome Allen – Celtics (2015–21 assistant coach); Pistons (2021–present assistant coach)
 Chauncey Billups – Celtics; Pistons (–)
 Lawrence Frank – Celtics (2010–11 assistant coach); Pistons (2011–13 head coach)
 Blake Griffin – Pistons (–); Celtics (–)
 Dick Harter – Pistons (1983–86 assistant coach); Celtics (2001–04 assistant coach)
 Jonas Jerebko- Pistons (–); Celtics (–)
 John Kuester – Celtics (1995–97 assistant coach); Pistons (2003–04 assistant coach, 2009–11 head coach)
 Tayshaun Prince – Pistons (–); Celtics
 Roy Rogers – Celtics (2010–11 assistant coach); Pistons (2011–12 assistant coach)
 Rasheed Wallace – Pistons (–); Celtics

See also
 National Basketball Association rivalries
 Celtics–Lakers rivalry
 Celtics–76ers rivalry
 Bulls–Pistons rivalry
 Lakers–Pistons rivalry

External links
 NBA.com - Reliving the Pistons-Celtics Rivalry
 ESPN.com - Celtics-Pistons rivalry: Top 10 games
 Boston.com - Cities share series of hoop moments

National Basketball Association rivalries
Detroit Pistons
Boston Celtics